Iltiosbahn is a funicular railway in the Canton of St. Gallen, Switzerland. It leads from Unterwasser at 911 m to Iltios at 1339 m, from where an aerial cableway continues to Chäserrugg (2262 m), a peak of the Churfirsten range above Lake Walen. The line has a length of 1195 m with a maximum incline of 27% and a difference of elevation of 428 m.

The funicular is owned and operated by Toggenburg Bergbahnen AG.

The railway was built in 1934, the aerial lift 1972.

References  

de:Iltiosbahn
Iltios
Transport in the canton of St. Gallen
Railway lines opened in 1934